José Antonio Santesteban (San Sebastián, 18 October 1835 – San Sebastián, 21 September 1906) was a Basque composer, the most famous of the musical family of that name (his father was José Juan Santesteban and his son was pianist Jesús de Santesteban), who wrote the first opera in Basque, Pudente, to a libretto by Serafin Baroja. In 1879 he succeeded his father's post as organist in Santa Maria, Donostia.

In 1863 he inaugurated the installment of a Cavaillé-Coll organ in Santa Maria, Donostia
 and in 1879 he succeeded his father's post as organist of the parish.

Works
 Pudente, the first Basque opera (2 acts, 15 music numbers, including Gernikako Arbola)
 12 masses for grand orchestra
 2 Misereres (1 for 4 voices)
 Psalms
 Motets
 24 Préludes pour piano, op. 84 (with dedication "to my friend Tomás Bretón")
 Cantos y Bailes Tradicionales Vascongados

References

External links 
 
 José Antonio Santesteban in Enciclopedia Auñamendi

Basque classical composers
1835 births
1906 deaths